Lawrence is an unincorporated community in northwestern Emery County, Utah, United States.

History
Lawrence was founded circa 1883 as a Mormon farming community. It formerly had its own post office and church, but the church was demolished in the 1950s. Sometimes called "Stakerville", Lawrence was named after Lawrence Staker.

See also

References

Unincorporated communities in Emery County, Utah
Unincorporated communities in Utah